Heylie Fung, also known as Fung Ching Hei (born 12 March 2003 in Hong Kong) is a Hong Kong professional squash player. As of September 2022, she was ranked number 184 in the world. She won the 2022 Eastside Open.

References

2003 births
Living people
Hong Kong female squash players
Competitors at the 2022 World Games